The 2005 African Junior Athletics Championships was the seventh edition of the biennial, continental athletics tournament for African athletes aged 19 years or younger. It was held in the Tunisian cities of Tunis and Radès from 1–4 September. A total of 44 events were contested, 22 by men and 22 by women.

The two cities also played dual hosts to the 2005 Arab Athletics Championships later that same month.

Medal summary

Men

Women

References

Results
African Junior Championships 2005. World Junior Athletics History. Retrieved on 2013-10-13.

African Junior Athletics Championships
African Junior Championships
International athletics competitions hosted by Tunisia
2005 in Tunisian sport
African Junior Athletics
Sports competitions in Tunis
21st century in Tunis
Sports competitions in Radès
21st century in Radès
2005 in youth sport